(singular ) is a form of verbal folk magic in Eastern Slavic folklore and mythology. Users of  use incantations to enchant objects or people.

Etymology 
The present-day Russian word  corresponds to the English word conjuration, which once meant a 'conspiracy, plot, act of plotting'.  ('what is performed with speech') originates from Russian folklore. So does the term , with its prefix of initiation na- and the root -govor ('speech'), meaning 'what is launched with speech'.

Their slight difference in sense can be seen in constructions like " from maleficium"/"from bullets" (defensive, apotropaic aspect) and nagovory onto water (to make it "healing"). The latter phrase seems to reflect a more offensive action.

The Ukrainian  and Belarusian  are semantically identical to the Russian , as they both possess the root -mov ('speech'). Both of these East Slavic words are close to the Polish term .

History 
The practice of  arose from pagan prayers and incantations, and so was initially based on the belief in the power of the human word. Hence followed the importance of exact pronunciation of the words (whether whispered or sung) as well as exact observing the associated rites. A great deal of life stamina was obligatory for a performer of the rites. As an example of this, a  practitioner should have either a full set of teeth, or a knife as a symbolic substitute for teeth that were missing.

In the Russian Empire,  praxes were for centuries prosecuted by its church and by its secular, caesaropapist authorities (at least from mid-17th till mid-19th century). Russian archives yielded more than 600 cases of church and civil prosecution of witchcraft, blasphemy and rational heresies in the 18th century. Even in 1832, after Digest of Laws of the Russian Empire had been first codified under the leadership of Mikhail Speransky, witchcraft and sorcery still remained a subject of the secular Penal law.

For the sake of survival  tradition began to mimic Christianity.  imagery became saturated with Christian themes and motifs, used as a reference base for performing magic acts. However within Byzantine written tradition (which embraced the Southern Slavs cultural intermediation) both Christian orthodoxy and some heterodox manuscripts circulated, which might echo back local heathen concepts.

Another layer in  heritage could be of Western origin. Each of the motifs shared by East and West Slavs has West European (mostly Germanic) matches. This indicates that West Slavic charms served as a mediator between the East Slavic tradition and Western influences.

The magical formula "Stop, blood, as still in the wound, as water/Jesus in the Jordan" is an example of a treated person's bleeding wound assimilation with a Medieval apocryphal story of how the Jordan waters stopped flowing when Jesus entered them. It is attested in Belarus, Ukraine, somewhat rare in South and West Russia. As for other Slavic traditions, the formula occurs in Poland and, even more commonly, in Polish texts recorded in Lithuania; it is also found in Czech charms, though intended against disorders other than bleeding.

Geographically the Eastern Slavic  tradition area could be roughly divided into two subareas (with their own subtraditions, correspondingly).

One of them is the tradition of the Russian North and adjoining Central Russian regions. This tradition was less influenced by neighboring cultures through direct contacts, though strongly influenced by the manuscript tradition. As a result it is not too diverse in the composition of plots and motifs. But the most famous plots, motifs and formulas which are considered an authentic feature of Russian (and all East Slavic)  (such as the motive of the sacred center, Alatyr stone on Buyan island amid holy sea) seem to come from there.

Within the second tradition, covering most of Ukraine and Belarus, as well as the south and west Russian regions, the West and South Slavic (as well as Byzantine) influence manifested itself to the greatest extent. The result is the coexistence and active interaction of plots, motifs and poetic formulas of different origins.

Mythological center and assimilation formulas 

In Eastern Slavic folk religion the concept of Navel of the World is embodied by a sacred stone Alatyr (frequently referred as white and hot), located somewhere in the East (either in a pristine ("clear") field or Buyan island amid a holy sea/ocean).

The Alatyr appears in most of the  under a variety of names. Much less than usually it is replaced by a sacred tree (for instance, a willow or a white birch) or a non-specified Christian church.

Appeals to such natural phenomena as dawn with red sun (and Eastern side of the world as such), young (new) moon, stars, winds are also very frequent.

As to personalized phenomena in those mythopoetic texts, one can see that heathen and Christian characters are often interchangeable. For instance, in different versions of the same , the supreme power that a practitioner applies to is either Maria (Mother of God) or "Dawn the Red Maiden" (Zorya).

In some of the  a practitioner appeals to Western side of the world for help in maleficium. Nevertheless, the absolute majority of  texts focused on good deeds, such as healing people and livestock, attracting luck, love affairs, wedding protection, birth support and public relations. It said: "...I behold a young crescent with golden horns, give, my God, golden horns to new moon, so give to me, for good deeds..."

Another type of  involved love magic "just as doves live in love, so would we with so-and-so do..." The practitioner performing this   (recorded in Perm Governorate) had to perform a bird sacrifice: the young man had to  catch and stab a dove and knead its fat into dough to bake a kind of a small kalach, which he then had to feed to the girl he loved, saying as he did so the short incantation quoted above.

A recorded in 1648  onto wax named "how to endure a torture" established that "both heaven and earth are made of bast", and then made a wish "just as the dead in the earth feel nothing, may so-and-so likewise feel no pain from any atrocities, any tortures".

The most usual beginning of a Russian North  was "blessed I rise, setting forth through doors and gates opening to the East, to the Eastern side, to the pristine field, to the sea-ocean, onward to the holy island of God... where lies the stone Alatyr..."

In the middle of  the body part the practitioner was seeking to influence was  patterned in assimilation with natural or sacred phenomena, as in this haemostatic example: "... just as the stone Alatyr yields no water, may I yield no blood ... neither a hen yields any milk, a cock any egg, nor would so-and-so bleed... neither blood from a bone, nor water from a stone..."

Humanities 
In Russian humanities, the term  is often used broadly, for any manifestation of faith in the magic power of the human word, thus applied to completely different cultural phenomena of the humankind (from Anglo-Saxon metrical charms to Atharvaveda's suktas).

See also 
 Anglo-Saxon metrical charms
 Apocryphal Prayer
 Merseburg charms
 Norito

Notes

References

Works cited 

 
 
 
  164 Pages.

Further reading 
 Mansikka, Viljo Johannes. Über Russische Zauberformeln mit Berucksichtigung der Blut- und Verrenkungssegen. Helsingfors, 1909. 
 Mansikka, Viljo Johannes. Die Religion der Ostslaven. I. Quellen // FF Communications. № 43. Suomalainen Tiedeakatemia. — Helsinki, 1922.
 Nevskaya, L.G., Sveshnikova T.N., Toporov V.N. Zagovorny text: genezis i struktura – Moscow: Indrik, 2005, 502 Pages // Language: Russian 
 
 Yudin, A.V. Onomastikon russkikh zagovorov: Moskovskii obshchestvennyi nauch. fond // Language: Russian, Moscow, 1997
 Yudin, A.V. Russkaya narodnaya duhovnaya kultura. Vysshaya shkola // Language: Russian 

External links 
 Collection of Russian zagovorov for different occasions in the Russian language.

Slavic mythology
Language and mysticism